From List of National Natural Landmarks, these are the National Natural Landmarks in Nevada.  There are 6 in total.

Nevada
National Natural Landmarks